XHYV-FM is a radio station on 94.5 FM in Córdoba, Veracruz. It is owned by Grupo Oliva Radio and known as El Patrón with a grupera format.

History
XEYV-AM 1180, a 250-watt daytimer based in Huatusco, received its concession on August 14, 1969. It was owned by Rosa Sofia Ruiz Ahumada. In the 1990s, XEYV moved to 880 kHz from Coscomatepec, allowing it to raise power from 1,000 to 5,000 watts.

XEYV was authorized to move to FM in November 2010.

References

External links
Oliva Radio Website

Radio stations in Veracruz